The Campeonato Nacional II Divisão de Futebol Feminino is the second-highest division of the Portuguese women's football league system, after the Campeonato Nacional de Futebol Feminino. It is run by the Portuguese Football Federation and began in 2008. The current champions are Benfica, who won their first title in 2019.

Competition 
As of 2017–18 there were 56 clubs in the Campeonato Promoção. During the first phase, clubs are divided into seven regionalised groups (Séries A–F and a four-club Série Madeira). The second phase comprises two groups of four teams (Série Norte and Série Sul). Each club plays the others twice (a double round-robin system), once at their home stadium and once at that of their opponents', for six games. Teams receive three points for a win and one point for a draw. No points are awarded for a loss. Teams are ranked by total points, then head-to-head points, head-to-head goal difference, goal difference, matches won, and goals scored. The group winners are promoted to the following season's Campeonato Nacional and meet in a two-legged Final phase to establish the champion.

After the creation of a third division whose inaugural season was 2020-21, the number of teams competing was reduced to 20 by 2021-22. In this format, the clubs were divided in only two series (north and South), with the best placed teams playing a subsequent phase to determine the champion.

History 

In 2008–09, coach Helena Costa steered Odivelas F.C. to the inaugural championship title. In September 2018 Benfica made their debut in the competition and beat U.D. Ponte de Frielas 28–0. The result established a new record winning margin in Portuguese senior football, beating Sporting CP's 21–0 win over Mindelense in 1971.

List of champions

References

External links
Official website 
Zerozero website 

Por
Sports leagues established in 2008
2008 establishments in Portugal
2
Recurring sporting events established in 2008
Women
Women's sports leagues in Portugal
Professional sports leagues in Portugal